Revolt in the Batchelor's House (German: Aufruhr im Junggesellenheim) is a 1929 German silent comedy film directed by Manfred Noa and starring Sig Arno, Kurt Gerron and Trude Hesterberg.

It was one of two films starring Arno and Gerron in their characters of 'Beef' and 'Steak' in an effort to create a German equivalent to Laurel and Hardy.

The film's sets were designed by Max Heilbronner.

Cast
 Sig Arno as Beef  
 Kurt Gerron as Steak 
 Trude Hesterberg as Die lustige Witwe  
 Käthe von Nagy as Käthe  
 Adele Sandrock as Tante Adele  
 Albert Paulig as Onkel Theobald  
 Yvette Darnys as Die lustige Ehefrau 
 Angelo Ferrari as Ihr Gatte

See also
 We Stick Together Through Thick and Thin (1929)

References

Bibliography
 Bock, Hans-Michael & Bergfelder, Tim. The Concise Cinegraph: Encyclopaedia of German Cinema. Berghahn Books, 2009.
 Prawer, S.S. Between Two Worlds: The Jewish Presence in German and Austrian Film, 1910-1933. Berghahn Books, 2005.

External links

1929 films
1929 comedy films
German comedy films
Films of the Weimar Republic
German silent feature films
Films directed by Manfred Noa
German black-and-white films
Buddy comedy films
Silent comedy films
1920s German films